Vincent Cheng (1948–2022) was chairman of the Hongkong and Shanghai Banking Corporation.

Vincent Cheng may also refer to:
 Vincent Cheng Kim Chuan, Singaporean Catholic social worker and dissent
 Vincent Cheng Wing-shun (born 1979), Hong Kong District Councillor